The Mamiya RB67 is a professional medium format single-lens reflex system camera manufactured by Mamiya. There are three successive models: the RB67 Professional (released in 1970), RB67 Pro-S (released in 1974) and RB67 Pro-SD (released in 1990). It is primarily designed for studio use, but can also be used in the field.

Details
The RB67 Professional was introduced in 1970 with a similar look to conventional medium format SLR cameras like the Hasselblad, but was larger due to the 6×7 cm frame format, closer to the typical 8×10 inch aspect ratio of portraits. However, the RB67 differed visually from other 6x7 cameras of the time, which resembled very large 35 mm cameras.

There are three successive models: the RB67 Professional (first model released in 1970), RB67 Pro-S (released in 1974) and RB67 Pro-SD (released in 1990). The RB67 is a modular camera system, meaning lenses, viewfinders, ground glasses, film winders and film backs are all interchangeable. It is primarily designed for studio use, but can also be used in the field. There is no shutter in the RB67; the Sekor lenses have built-in mechanical leaf shutters which are cocked and triggered from the body. Focusing is performed with a bellows on the body. It is a completely mechanical camera requiring no batteries.

The camera accepts 6×7, 120 and 220 film magazines and Polaroid backs. Multiple exposures are possible in the M-mode. Mirror flip up is supported. The flange distance is 110 mm.

The RB in the name stands for "Rotating Back", a concept dating back to early Graflex cameras as early as 1907. The RB67 takes backs which can be rotated 90 degrees to provide a horizontal or vertical composition. The orientation is shown in the viewfinder with a combination of black and red lines, the latter indicating landscape orientation.

The Mamiya evolution
Mamiya began producing folding cameras for 120 size medium format film in 1940 during WWII.  They introduced their first medium format twin lens reflex camera in 1948, and through the 1950s they built TLR cameras similar to the German Rolleiflex Automat. In 1957 they introduced the Mamiyaflex C which incorporated several common features from large format press cameras: a bellows focussing system, and interchangeable lenses.  It is regarded as the most advanced TLR system of the time; one of the few TLRs with interchangeable lenses. Despite their initial popularity with the press, by the late 1960s other companies were successfully producing and marketing medium format SLRs with exchangeable film backs, allowing a photographer to switch film types easily—not needing multiple cameras.  

While several competitors offered medium format SLR cameras, there was not a successful offering with bellows focussing and a rotating back.  There are also advantages to having a leaf shutter incorporated into the lens, especially for flash synchronization (Sherman Pg 86). New medium format SLR offerings in the late 1960s like the Pentax 6×7, began to resemble a conventional 35 mm SLR cameras, with interchangeable viewfinder and lenses, and horizontal film paths. To compete, Mamiya added the RB67 alongside their advanced TLR, the C330, but using SLR, a horizontal film path, and exchangeable film magazines, while retaining the bellows focus and front-leaf shutter system. Polaroid exchangeable backs allowed instant photography with many professional cameras including the RB67.

The concept is similar in layout to Hasselblad cameras, though the RB67 is much larger and heavier, due to the inclusion of traditional professional features such as bellows focussing and the rotating back.

See also
Mamiya RZ67

References

General references
 Shell, Bob. Mamiya Medium Format Systems. Hove Pro-Guide. Hove: Hove Photo, 1992. .
 Moore, Paul. Shooting Old Film Cameras – Mamiya RB67 Professional. Self-published, 2013. .
 Gustavson, Todd. Camera: a History of Photography from Daguerreotype to Digital. Sterling Signature, 2012. .
 Sherman, Bennet. Leaf Shutter SLR: Why?. Popular Photography. January 1960.

120 film cameras
Mamiya SLR cameras